Lee Colkin (born 15 July 1974) is an English former professional footballer who played in the Football League as a defender for Northampton Town and Leyton Orient. He then moved into non-League football to play for 
Hednesford Town, Morecambe, Burton Albion, Grantham Town, 
Tamworth, 
Hinckley United, 
Kettering Town, 
Hucknall Town, 
Barwell, Stamford, 
Ellistown, where he was player-assistant manager, Atherstone Town 
and Stratford Town.

References

External links

1974 births
Living people
Sportspeople from Nuneaton
English footballers
Association football defenders
Northampton Town F.C. players
Leyton Orient F.C. players
Hednesford Town F.C. players
Morecambe F.C. players
Burton Albion F.C. players
Tamworth F.C. players
Grantham Town F.C. players
Hinckley United F.C. players
Kettering Town F.C. players
Hucknall Town F.C. players
Barwell F.C. players
Stamford A.F.C. players
Ellistown F.C. players
Atherstone Town F.C. players
Stratford Town F.C. players
English Football League players
National League (English football) players
English football managers
Rugby Town F.C. managers
East Midlands Counties Football League players